The 2003–04 Los Angeles Kings season was their 37th National Hockey League season. The Kings placed third in their division, 11th overall in their conference, and failed to qualify for the playoffs due to a season-ending, 11-game losing streak.

Offseason

Regular season

Final standings

Schedule and results

|- align="center" bgcolor="#FFBBBB"
|1||L||October 9, 2003||2–3 || align="left"| @ Detroit Red Wings (2003–04) ||0–1–0–0 || 
|- align="center" bgcolor="#CCFFCC" 
|2||W||October 10, 2003||3–0 || align="left"| @ Pittsburgh Penguins (2003–04) ||1–1–0–0 || 
|- align="center" bgcolor="#CCFFCC" 
|3||W||October 12, 2003||4–2 || align="left"| @ Chicago Blackhawks (2003–04) ||2–1–0–0 || 
|- align="center" bgcolor="#CCFFCC" 
|4||W||October 15, 2003||4–3 || align="left"|  Ottawa Senators (2003–04) ||3–1–0–0 || 
|- align="center" bgcolor="#FFBBBB"
|5||L||October 18, 2003||3–4 || align="left"|  Boston Bruins (2003–04) ||3–2–0–0 || 
|- align="center" bgcolor="#CCFFCC" 
|6||W||October 21, 2003||4–0 || align="left"|  Philadelphia Flyers (2003–04) ||4–2–0–0 || 
|- align="center" bgcolor="#FFBBBB"
|7||L||October 23, 2003||1–5 || align="left"|  Buffalo Sabres (2003–04) ||4–3–0–0 || 
|- align="center" bgcolor="#FFBBBB"
|8||L||October 25, 2003||2–3 || align="left"|  Chicago Blackhawks (2003–04) ||4–4–0–0 || 
|- align="center" bgcolor="#FFBBBB"
|9||L||October 30, 2003||1–3 || align="left"|  Vancouver Canucks (2003–04) ||4–5–0–0 || 
|-

|- align="center" bgcolor="#CCFFCC" 
|10||W||November 1, 2003||7–3 || align="left"|  Phoenix Coyotes (2003–04) ||5–5–0–0 || 
|- align="center" bgcolor="#CCFFCC" 
|11||W||November 5, 2003||3–2 || align="left"| @ Florida Panthers (2003–04) ||6–5–0–0 || 
|- align="center" bgcolor="#CCFFCC" 
|12||W||November 6, 2003||1–0 OT|| align="left"| @ Tampa Bay Lightning (2003–04) ||7–5–0–0 || 
|- align="center" bgcolor="#FF6F6F"
|13||OTL||November 8, 2003||2–3 OT|| align="left"| @ Carolina Hurricanes (2003–04) ||7–5–0–1 || 
|- align="center" bgcolor="#CCFFCC" 
|14||W||November 10, 2003||3–2 || align="left"| @ Washington Capitals (2003–04) ||8–5–0–1 || 
|- align="center" 
|15||T||November 13, 2003||4–4 OT|| align="left"|  Toronto Maple Leafs (2003–04) ||8–5–1–1 || 
|- align="center" bgcolor="#FFBBBB"
|16||L||November 15, 2003||0–1 || align="left"|  St. Louis Blues (2003–04) ||8–6–1–1 || 
|- align="center" bgcolor="#CCFFCC" 
|17||W||November 19, 2003||3–0 || align="left"|  Nashville Predators (2003–04) ||9–6–1–1 || 
|- align="center" bgcolor="#FFBBBB"
|18||L||November 21, 2003||1–3 || align="left"| @ Dallas Stars (2003–04) ||9–7–1–1 || 
|- align="center" bgcolor="#CCFFCC" 
|19||W||November 22, 2003||2–0 || align="left"| @ Colorado Avalanche (2003–04) ||10–7–1–1 || 
|- align="center" bgcolor="#FFBBBB"
|20||L||November 25, 2003||0–4 || align="left"|  New Jersey Devils (2003–04) ||10–8–1–1 || 
|- align="center" bgcolor="#FFBBBB"
|21||L||November 27, 2003||4–6 || align="left"| @ Phoenix Coyotes (2003–04) ||10–9–1–1 || 
|- align="center" bgcolor="#CCFFCC" 
|22||W||November 29, 2003||3–1 || align="left"|  Chicago Blackhawks (2003–04) ||11–9–1–1 || 
|- align="center" bgcolor="#CCFFCC" 
|23||W||November 30, 2003||2–1 || align="left"| @ Dallas Stars (2003–04) ||12–9–1–1 || 
|-

|- align="center" bgcolor="#FFBBBB"
|24||L||December 2, 2003||1–4 || align="left"| @ St. Louis Blues (2003–04) ||12–10–1–1 || 
|- align="center" bgcolor="#CCFFCC" 
|25||W||December 4, 2003||3–0 || align="left"|  Dallas Stars (2003–04) ||13–10–1–1 || 
|- align="center" bgcolor="#CCFFCC" 
|26||W||December 6, 2003||7–3 || align="left"|  Washington Capitals (2003–04) ||14–10–1–1 || 
|- align="center" bgcolor="#FF6F6F"
|27||OTL||December 8, 2003||2–3 OT|| align="left"| @ Detroit Red Wings (2003–04) ||14–10–1–2 || 
|- align="center" bgcolor="#FF6F6F"
|28||OTL||December 10, 2003||3–4 OT|| align="left"| @ Atlanta Thrashers (2003–04) ||14–10–1–3 || 
|- align="center" bgcolor="#CCFFCC" 
|29||W||December 11, 2003||4–1 || align="left"| @ Nashville Predators (2003–04) ||15–10–1–3 || 
|- align="center" bgcolor="#FFBBBB"
|30||L||December 13, 2003||1–2 || align="left"| @ St. Louis Blues (2003–04) ||15–11–1–3 || 
|- align="center" bgcolor="#CCFFCC" 
|31||W||December 16, 2003||4–2 || align="left"|  Edmonton Oilers (2003–04) ||16–11–1–3 || 
|- align="center" 
|32||T||December 18, 2003||4–4 OT|| align="left"|  Phoenix Coyotes (2003–04) ||16–11–2–3 || 
|- align="center" 
|33||T||December 20, 2003||3–3 OT|| align="left"|  Colorado Avalanche (2003–04) ||16–11–3–3 || 
|- align="center" 
|34||T||December 22, 2003||4–4 OT|| align="left"| @ Vancouver Canucks (2003–04) ||16–11–4–3 || 
|- align="center" bgcolor="#FFBBBB"
|35||L||December 26, 2003||0–5 || align="left"| @ San Jose Sharks (2003–04) ||16–12–4–3 || 
|- align="center" 
|36||T||December 27, 2003||4–4 OT|| align="left"|  San Jose Sharks (2003–04) ||16–12–5–3 || 
|- align="center" bgcolor="#FF6F6F"
|37||OTL||December 30, 2003||2–3 OT|| align="left"|  New York Rangers (2003–04) ||16–12–5–4 || 
|- align="center" bgcolor="#FFBBBB"
|38||L||December 31, 2003||0–4 || align="left"| @ Phoenix Coyotes (2003–04) ||16–13–5–4 || 
|-

|- align="center" 
|39||T||January 3, 2004||2–2 OT|| align="left"|  Dallas Stars (2003–04) ||16–13–6–4 || 
|- align="center" 
|40||T||January 7, 2004||4–4 OT|| align="left"| @ Mighty Ducks of Anaheim (2003–04) ||16–13–7–4 || 
|- align="center" bgcolor="#FFBBBB"
|41||L||January 8, 2004||1–3 || align="left"|  Vancouver Canucks (2003–04) ||16–14–7–4 || 
|- align="center" 
|42||T||January 10, 2004||2–2 OT|| align="left"|  Columbus Blue Jackets (2003–04) ||16–14–8–4 || 
|- align="center" 
|43||T||January 13, 2004||0–0 OT|| align="left"| @ Nashville Predators (2003–04) ||16–14–9–4 || 
|- align="center" 
|44||T||January 14, 2004||2–2 OT|| align="left"| @ Minnesota Wild (2003–04) ||16–14–10–4 || 
|- align="center" bgcolor="#FF6F6F"
|45||OTL||January 16, 2004||2–3 OT|| align="left"| @ Columbus Blue Jackets (2003–04) ||16–14–10–5 || 
|- align="center" bgcolor="#CCFFCC" 
|46||W||January 18, 2004||2–1 || align="left"| @ Chicago Blackhawks (2003–04) ||17–14–10–5 || 
|- align="center" bgcolor="#CCFFCC" 
|47||W||January 20, 2004||4–1 || align="left"|  Calgary Flames (2003–04) ||18–14–10–5 || 
|- align="center" bgcolor="#FFBBBB"
|48||L||January 22, 2004||4–5 || align="left"|  Detroit Red Wings (2003–04) ||18–15–10–5 || 
|- align="center" bgcolor="#CCFFCC" 
|49||W||January 24, 2004||4–2 || align="left"|  Mighty Ducks of Anaheim (2003–04) ||19–15–10–5 || 
|- align="center" 
|50||T||January 26, 2004||2–2 OT|| align="left"|  Minnesota Wild (2003–04) ||19–15–11–5 || 
|- align="center" bgcolor="#CCFFCC" 
|51||W||January 28, 2004||4–3 OT|| align="left"| @ Mighty Ducks of Anaheim (2003–04) ||20–15–11–5 || 
|- align="center" 
|52||T||January 29, 2004||3–3 OT|| align="left"|  Colorado Avalanche (2003–04) ||20–15–12–5 || 
|- align="center" bgcolor="#CCFFCC" 
|53||W||January 31, 2004||4–3 || align="left"| @ Edmonton Oilers (2003–04) ||21–15–12–5 || 
|-

|- align="center" 
|54||T||February 3, 2004||4–4 OT|| align="left"| @ Calgary Flames (2003–04) ||21–15–13–5 || 
|- align="center" bgcolor="#CCFFCC" 
|55||W||February 10, 2004||3–1 || align="left"| @ Minnesota Wild (2003–04) ||22–15–13–5 || 
|- align="center" bgcolor="#FF6F6F"
|56||OTL||February 11, 2004||2–3 OT|| align="left"| @ Columbus Blue Jackets (2003–04) ||22–15–13–6 || 
|- align="center" bgcolor="#FFBBBB"
|57||L||February 13, 2004||3–8 || align="left"| @ Buffalo Sabres (2003–04) ||22–16–13–6 || 
|- align="center" bgcolor="#FF6F6F"
|58||OTL||February 15, 2004||2–3 OT|| align="left"| @ New Jersey Devils (2003–04) ||22–16–13–7 || 
|- align="center" 
|59||T||February 16, 2004||1–1 OT|| align="left"| @ New York Islanders (2003–04) ||22–16–14–7 || 
|- align="center" bgcolor="#FFBBBB"
|60||L||February 18, 2004||3–4 || align="left"|  Dallas Stars (2003–04) ||22–17–14–7 || 
|- align="center" bgcolor="#CCFFCC" 
|61||W||February 21, 2004||4–3 || align="left"|  Columbus Blue Jackets (2003–04) ||23–17–14–7 || 
|- align="center" bgcolor="#CCFFCC" 
|62||W||February 23, 2004||3–0 || align="left"|  Nashville Predators (2003–04) ||24–17–14–7 || 
|- align="center" 
|63||T||February 25, 2004||1–1 OT|| align="left"| @ Dallas Stars (2003–04) ||24–17–15–7 || 
|- align="center" bgcolor="#CCFFCC" 
|64||W||February 28, 2004||2–1 || align="left"|  Mighty Ducks of Anaheim (2003–04) ||25–17–15–7 || 
|- align="center" bgcolor="#FFBBBB"
|65||L||February 29, 2004||3–6 || align="left"| @ Mighty Ducks of Anaheim (2003–04) ||25–18–15–7 || 
|-

|- align="center" 
|66||T||March 4, 2004||1–1 OT|| align="left"|  Minnesota Wild (2003–04) ||25–18–16–7 || 
|- align="center" bgcolor="#FFBBBB"
|67||L||March 6, 2004||2–4 || align="left"|  Montreal Canadiens (2003–04) ||25–19–16–7 || 
|- align="center" bgcolor="#CCFFCC" 
|68||W||March 9, 2004||3–2 || align="left"|  Phoenix Coyotes (2003–04) ||26–19–16–7 || 
|- align="center" bgcolor="#CCFFCC" 
|69||W||March 10, 2004||3–1 || align="left"| @ Phoenix Coyotes (2003–04) ||27–19–16–7 || 
|- align="center" bgcolor="#FFBBBB"
|70||L||March 13, 2004||1–3 || align="left"| @ San Jose Sharks (2003–04) ||27–20–16–7 || 
|- align="center" bgcolor="#CCFFCC" 
|71||W||March 14, 2004||5–1 || align="left"|  Mighty Ducks of Anaheim (2003–04) ||28–20–16–7 || 
|- align="center" bgcolor="#FFBBBB"
|72||L||March 16, 2004||3–5 || align="left"|  St. Louis Blues (2003–04) ||28–21–16–7 || 
|- align="center" bgcolor="#FFBBBB"
|73||L||March 18, 2004||3–5 || align="left"|  San Jose Sharks (2003–04) ||28–22–16–7 || 
|- align="center" bgcolor="#FFBBBB"
|74||L||March 20, 2004||2–4 || align="left"|  Detroit Red Wings (2003–04) ||28–23–16–7 || 
|- align="center" bgcolor="#FFBBBB"
|75||L||March 22, 2004||1–2 || align="left"|  Edmonton Oilers (2003–04) ||28–24–16–7 || 
|- align="center" bgcolor="#FFBBBB"
|76||L||March 24, 2004||0–1 || align="left"| @ Vancouver Canucks (2003–04) ||28–25–16–7 || 
|- align="center" bgcolor="#FFBBBB"
|77||L||March 26, 2004||1–3 || align="left"| @ Edmonton Oilers (2003–04) ||28–26–16–7 || 
|- align="center" bgcolor="#FF6F6F"
|78||OTL||March 27, 2004||2–3 OT|| align="left"| @ Calgary Flames (2003–04) ||28–26–16–8 || 
|- align="center" bgcolor="#FFBBBB"
|79||L||March 29, 2004||1–2 || align="left"| @ Colorado Avalanche (2003–04) ||28–27–16–8 || 
|- align="center" bgcolor="#FFBBBB"
|80||L||March 31, 2004||0–3 || align="left"|  San Jose Sharks (2003–04) ||28–28–16–8 || 
|-

|- align="center" bgcolor="#FFBBBB"
|81||L||April 2, 2004||2–3 || align="left"|  Calgary Flames (2003–04) ||28–29–16–8 || 
|- align="center" bgcolor="#FF6F6F"
|82||OTL||April 4, 2004||3–4 OT|| align="left"| @ San Jose Sharks (2003–04) ||28–29–16–9 || 
|-

|-
| Legend:

Player statistics

Scoring
 Position abbreviations: C = Center; D = Defense; G = Goaltender; LW = Left Wing; RW = Right Wing
  = Joined team via a transaction (e.g., trade, waivers, signing) during the season. Stats reflect time with the Kings only.
  = Left team via a transaction (e.g., trade, waivers, release) during the season. Stats reflect time with the Kings only.

Goaltending

Awards and records

Awards

Milestones

Transactions
The Kings were involved in the following transactions from June 10, 2003, the day after the deciding game of the 2003 Stanley Cup Finals, through June 7, 2004, the day of the deciding game of the 2004 Stanley Cup Finals.

Trades

Players acquired

Players lost

Signings

Draft picks
Los Angeles' picks of the 2003 NHL Entry Draft held at the Gaylord Entertainment Center in Nashville, Tennessee on June 21, 2003.

Notes

References

 
 

Los
Los
Los Angeles Kings seasons
LA Kings
LA Kings